Passions is a 1984 American made-for-television drama film written by Janet Greek and Robin Maxwell and directed by Sandor Stern. The film stars Joanne Woodward, Lindsay Wagner, Richard Crenna, Mason Adams and Heather Langenkamp. The plot focuses on a widow who discovers her late husband led a double life and had a son with another woman during the course of their marriage. The film premiered on CBS and while the performances were met with positive reviews, the storyline has been met with some criticism.

Plot
Businessman Richard Kennerly is married to the socialite Catherine, and they have a daughter, Beth. Richard leads a seemingly normal life in Beverly Hills with his wife and daughter, but this masks an affair he has been having for the past 8 years with an artist, Nina Simon, with whom he has a six-year-old son, Eric. Richard set Nina and their son up in a beachside home in Malibu and has been living a double life. Catherine is unaware of Nina and Richard's relationship, while Nina accepts the circumstances for what they are and continues the affair.

While at home with his wife and daughter, Beth explains to Richard that she wants to move out with her boyfriend. Richard soon becomes severely ill and dies. The double life that he once lived is exposed. Catherine discovers the extramarital relationship that he had and becomes aware of who his mistress was.

Devastated, Catherine discovers Richard's son, Eric, with Nina but realizes that he left nothing for the child. Catherine and Nina begin to feud, and Catherine refuses to acknowledge the child's existence. Nina wants her son's education to be paid for, but Catherine clashes with her. The two women get into a fist fight at Richard's funeral. However, they soon realize that they were both manipulated by him and settle their differences.

Cast
 Joanne Woodward as Catherine Kennerly 
 Lindsay Wagner as Nina Simon
 Richard Crenna as Richard Kennerly
 Mason Adams as Ron Sandler
 Heather Langenkamp as Beth Kennerly
 John Considine as Jack Blaine
 R.J. Williams as Eric
 Viveca Lindfors as Lila

Reception
The film has been met with mixed to positive reviews. Joanna Berry of Radio Times praised Woodward and Wagner's performances but described the film as "predictable". Jeff Jarvis of People said "There’s drama here and rich human interaction." and praised the direction of the film and the performances of Woodward, Wagner, Crenna, and Langenkamp.

References

External links
 

1984 television films
1984 films
1984 drama films
Carson Productions films
CBS network films
Films scored by Bruce Broughton
Films directed by Sandor Stern
American drama television films
1980s English-language films
1980s American films